José Arthur Sanches Filho  (born March 28, 1988), known as just Arthur Sanches, is a Brazilian football (soccer) defender who is playing for Al-Sailiya in Qatar.

References

Brazilian footballers
Living people
1988 births
Avaí FC players
Sociedade Esportiva Palmeiras players
Associação Portuguesa de Desportos players
Al Hilal SFC players
Cruzeiro Esporte Clube players
Al-Rayyan SC players
Al-Sailiya SC players
Saudi Professional League players
Qatar Stars League players
Association football defenders